Dawn Tallman is an American soul, R&B and gospel singer.

Biography
She is marketed as "The Queen of Gospel Energy" by her record company. She was  born and raised in Danbury, Connecticut, and started singing in church and later on was featured in a great number of R&B and dance recordings. She has cooperated with a great number of recording artists and DJs and made part of various ensemble groups traveling internationally.

In 1997, she was featured on "Set My Spirit Free" with Kings Of Tomorrow (K.O.T.), in 1999 in remix of "Wake Up" remixed by Hex Hector and in 2000 in Soulstar Syndicate EP Take Me (Mind, Body & Soul). The song charted on SNEP, the official French Singles Chart.

In 2005, she was part of U.D.A.U.F.L., an acronym for Underground Dance Artists United For Life, a collaboration of Dance music acts put together by the producer duo Blaze.

In 2006, she was featured in DJ Disciple single "Work It Out", released under DJ Disciple's Catch 22 Recordings label, becoming a dance hit record. It was played in Ibiza in 2006, BBC Radio 1 DJ Pete Tong the track appeared on a number of labels and compilations such as Xtravaganza (UK), Blanco Y Negro (Spain), Poole Music (France), Networks (Italy) and United (Belgium). It was a charting hit in Spain. In 2008, "Work It Out" was re-released with remixes by Klass for House Trained Records.

In October 2006, Dawn Tallman released a single through West End Records entitled "Save a Place on the Dance Floor For Me" written by West End Records founder Mel Cheren and Warren Rigg and produced by DJ Gomi.

In 2015, she was featured on Bob Sinclar's "Feel the Vibe" charting in France, Belgium and Italy, as well as going to number one on the US Dance chart.

Discography

EPs / Remix albums
2010: Take Me (Mind, Body & Soul) - Soulstar Syndicate feat. Dawn Tallman 
2010: It Starts With Us - Beaten Soul feat Dawn Tallman 
2011: Fearless People - JFortino feat. Dawn Tallman & Heather Leigh West 
2015: Feel The Vibe (Remixes)- Bob Sinclar feat. Dawn Tallman

Singles
(charting, selective)

*Did not appear in the official Belgian Ultratop 50 charts, but rather in the bubbling under Ultratip charts.

References

External links
Facebook
Twitter
Discogs page

American women singers
21st-century African-American women singers
American house musicians
Living people
Year of birth missing (living people)